Tory Dickson (born 26 September 1987) is a former Australian rules footballer who played for the  in the Australian Football League (AFL). He played mainly as a medium-sized forward.

Career
Before joining the Western Bulldogs, Dickson had been playing for various football clubs around Victoria. In 2009, he won the best and fairest award at Victorian Football League (VFL) club Frankston. After being overlooked for the AFL Draft, Dickson played for Noble Park in the Eastern Football League. In 2011, Dickson signed with the Bendigo Bombers and kicked 48 goals in 19 games.

At the age of 24, Dickson was selected by the Western Bulldogs in the 2011 National Draft, with pick #57. Dickson made his debut in round 1 of the 2012 AFL season against . He struggled to make an impact, and was dropped the following week.

After spending a month playing for his third VFL club, the Bulldogs' former affiliate Williamstown, Dickson was recalled to the Bulldogs for their round 7 match against .

Dickson is noted for the accuracy of his kicking for goal. He was the most accurate of all AFL players in 2019, and the third-most accurate since 1965.

On September 27, 2020, Dickson announced his retirement from AFL football.

Statistics
 Statistics are correct to the end of the 2019 season

|- style="background:#eaeaea;"
! scope="row" style="text-align:center" | 2012
|style="text-align:center;"|
| 29 || 17 || 23 || 9 || 119 || 118 || 237 || 56 || 64 || 1.4 || 0.5 || 7.0 || 6.9 || 13.9 || 3.3 || 3.8
|-
! scope="row" style="text-align:center" | 2013
|style="text-align:center;"|
| 29 || 13 || 22 || 10 || 108 || 75 || 183 || 48 || 39 || 1.7 || 0.8 || 8.3 || 5.8 || 14.1 || 3.7 || 3.0
|- style="background:#eaeaea;"
! scope="row" style="text-align:center" | 2014
|style="text-align:center;"|
| 29 || 4 || 3 || 1 || 18 || 21 || 39 || 9 || 9 || 0.8 || 0.3 || 4.5 || 5.3 || 9.8 || 2.3 || 2.3
|-
! scope="row" style="text-align:center" | 2015
|style="text-align:center;"|
| 29 || 23 || 50 || 12 || 172 || 126 || 298 || 71 || 72 || 2.2 || 0.5 || 7.5 || 5.5 || 13.0 || 3.1 || 3.1
|- style="background:#eaeaea;"
| scope=row bgcolor=F0E68C | 2016# 
|style="text-align:center;"|
| 29 || 22 || 40 || 17 || 166 || 132 || 298 || 92 || 57 || 1.8 || 0.8 || 7.5 || 6.0 || 13.5 || 4.2 || 2.6
|-
! scope="row" style="text-align:center" | 2017
|style="text-align:center;"|
| 29 || 9 || 11 || 3 || 44 || 48 || 92 || 33 || 27 || 1.2 || 0.3 || 4.9 || 5.3 || 10.2 || 3.7 || 3.0
|- style="background:#eaeaea;"
! scope="row" style="text-align:center" | 2018
|style="text-align:center;"|
| 29 || 8 || 8 || 1 || 42 || 34 || 76 || 24 || 15 || 1.0 || 0.1 || 5.3 || 4.3 || 9.5 || 3.0 || 1.9
|-
! scope="row" style="text-align:center" | 2019
|style="text-align:center;"|
| 29 || 17 || 24 || 8 || 109 || 85 || 194 || 60 || 41 || 1.4 || 0.5 || 6.4 || 5.0 || 11.4 || 3.5 || 2.4
|- class="sortbottom"
! colspan=3| Career
! 113
! 181
! 61
! 778
! 639
! 1417
! 393
! 324
! 1.6
! 0.5
! 6.9
! 5.7
! 12.5
! 3.5
! 2.9
|}

Honours and achievements
AFL
Team
AFL premiership: 2016
Brad Johnson Best Team Player (2015)
VFL
Team
VFL premiership: 2014

References

External links

1987 births
Living people
People educated at Haileybury (Melbourne)
Western Bulldogs players
Western Bulldogs Premiership players
Australian rules footballers from Victoria (Australia)
Bendigo Football Club players
Frankston Football Club players
Williamstown Football Club players
One-time VFL/AFL Premiership players